The 214 Kangxi radicals, also known as the Zihui radicals, form a system of radicals of Chinese characters. 
The radicals are numbered in stroke count order. They are the most popular system of radicals for dictionaries that order Traditional Chinese characters (hanzi, hanja, kanji,  chữ hán) by radical and stroke count.  They are officially part of the Unicode encoding system for CJKV characters, in their standard order, under the coding block "Kangxi radicals", while their graphic variants are contained in the "CJK Radicals Supplement".  Thus, a reference to "radical 61", for example, without additional context, refers to the 61st radical of the Kangxi Dictionary, 心; xīn "heart".

Originally introduced in the 1615 Zihui (字彙), they are more commonly named in relation to the Kangxi Dictionary of 1716 (Kāngxī  being the era name for 1662–1723). The 1915 encyclopedic word dictionary Ciyuan (辭源) also uses this system.  In modern times, many dictionaries that list Traditional Chinese head characters continue to use this system.  For example, the Wang Li Character Dictionary of Ancient Chinese (王力古漢語字典, 2000) adopted the Kangxi radicals system.  The system of 214 Kangxi radicals is based on the older system of 540 radicals used in the Han-era Shuowen Jiezi.  Since 2009, the PRC government has promoted a 201-radical system (Table of Han Character Radicals, 汉字部首表) as a national standard for Simplified Chinese (see Table of Indexing Chinese Character Components).

Statistics

The Kangxi dictionary lists a total of 47,035 characters divided among the 214 radicals, for an average of 220 characters per radical, but distribution is unequal, the median number of characters per radical being 64, with a maximum number of 1,902 characters (for radical 140  ) and a minimum number of five (radical 138  ). The radicals have between one and seventeen strokes, the median number of strokes being 5 while the average number of strokes is slightly below 5.7.

The ten radicals with the largest number of characters account for 10,665 characters (or 23% of the dictionary). The same ten radicals account for 7,141 out of 20,992 characters (34%) in the Unicode CJK Unified Ideographs block as introduced in 1992, as follows:

Modern dictionaries
Modern Chinese dictionaries continue to use the Kangxi radical-stroke order, both in traditional zìdiǎn (lit. "character/logograph dictionary") for written Chinese characters and modern cídiǎn ( "word/phrase dictionary") for spoken expressions. The 214 Kangxi radicals act as a de facto standard, which may not be duplicated exactly in every Chinese dictionary, but which few dictionary compilers can afford to completely ignore.  They also serve as the basis for many computer encoding systems, including Unihan. The number of radicals may be reduced in modern practical dictionaries, as some of the more obscure Kangxi radicals do not form any characters that remain in frequent use. Thus, the  Oxford Concise English–Chinese Dictionary, for example, has 188 radicals. The Xinhua Zidian, a pocket-sized character dictionary containing about 13,000 characters, uses 189 radicals, later (10th ed.) increased to 201 to conform to a national standard (see List of Xinhua Zidian radicals). A few dictionaries also introduce new radicals, treating groups of radicals that are used together in many different characters as a kind of radical. For example, Hanyu Da Cidian, the most inclusive available Chinese dictionary (published in 1993) has 23,000 head character entries organised by a novel system of 200 radicals.

Table of radicals

In Unicode

In Unicode version 3.0 (1999), a separate Kangxi Radicals block was introduced which encodes the 214 radicals in sequence, at U+2F00–2FD5. These are specific code points intended to represent the radical qua radical, as opposed to the character consisting of the unaugmented radical; thus, U+2F00 represents radical 1 while U+4E00 represents the character yī meaning "one". In addition, the CJK Radicals Supplement block (2E80–2EFF) was introduced, encoding alternative (often positional) forms taken by Kangxi radicals as they appear within specific characters. For example, ⺁ "CJK RADICAL CLIFF" (U+2E81) is a variant of ⼚ radical 27 (U+2F1A), itself identical in shape to the character consisting of unaugmented radical 27, 厂 "cliff" (U+5382).

See also

 List of Shuowen Jiezi radicals
 List of radicals in Unicode
 Unicode chart – Kangxi Radicals (above)
 Unicode chart – CJK Radicals Supplement
 Table of Indexing Chinese Character Components (aka List of Xinhua Zidian radicals) – 189 radicals
 List of Japanese radicals
 Section headers of a Chinese dictionary
 CJK Unified Ideographs

References

 An Analysis of the Two Chinese Radical Systems, Journal of the Chinese Language Teachers Association, 13, 2, 95–109, May 78

External links

 Simplified Chinese characters with English definitions, grouped by radicals
 Table of the 214 radicals in the unicode project
 List of radicals in home-printable A4 layout (archived copy at the Wayback Machine)
 List of 214 Japanese radicals and exceptions to Kangxi, searchable and grouped by stroke number
 Tangorin, search Japanese kanji using the 214 Kangxi radicals (archived copy at the Wayback Machine)
 Chinese characters by radical
List of Radicals, meaning and naming with Japanese.
Chinese etymology search radicals and receive the meaning as well as illustrations of radicals in history

 
Chinese characters
Chinese dictionaries
Collation
Kangxi Emperor